Lituya Bay (Tlingit: Ltu.aa, meaning 'lake within the point') is a fjord located on the coast of the south-east part of the U.S. state of Alaska. The bay was noted in 1786 by Jean-François de Lapérouse, who named it Port des Français. Twenty-one of his men perished in the tidal current in the bay.

Description

The smaller Cascade and Crillon glaciers and the larger Lituya Glacier all spill into Lituya Bay, which is a part of Glacier Bay National Park and Preserve. Cenotaph Island is located roughly in the middle of the bay.

Tidal currents in the entrance reach . The entrance is considered dangerous to navigation, especially when the tidal currents are running, but the interior of the bay provides good protection to anchored ships.

Lituya Bay is also famous for four recorded tsunamis, in 1854, 1899, 1936, and 1958.

The bay is mentioned in Jack London's short story, "The Unexpected". (In that story, the name of the bay is spelled "Latuya".)

1958 megatsunami

The same topography that leads to the heavy tidal currents also created the tsunami with the highest runup against a hillside in recorded history. There were three fishing boats anchored near the entrance of Lituya Bay on the day the giant wave occurred. One boat (the Sunmore) was sunk by the wave and debris as it attempted to exit the bay, and the two people on board (a married couple, the Wagners) were killed. The second boat (the Badger) was carried across the la Chasseuse, spit into the ocean, hit by a floating log and sunk but not before its occupants (a married couple, the Swansons) in spite of injuries, managed to board a skiff ultimately to be rescued. The third boat, the Edrie, crewed by father and son the Ulriches, was anchored at the opposite side of the bay entrance. The father, Howard, turned the boat to face the wave, which picked her up, snapped her anchor chain, carried her above the trees but then washed her back into the bay with no major damage. William A. Swanson and Howard G. Ulrich provided accounts of what they observed. Based on Swanson's description of the length of time it took the wave to reach his boat after overtopping Cenotaph Island near the bay's entrance, the wave may have been traveling . When it reached the open sea, however, it dissipated quickly. This incident was the first direct evidence and eyewitness report of the existence of megatsunamis.

See also

Lituya Mountain

References 
Guinness World Records Ltd. (2005). Guinness World Records 2006: 84.
Mega-tsunami: Wave of Destruction. Horizon. BBC Two, 12 October 2000

External links 
E. W. Eickelberg, Lituya Bay, Gulf of Alaska. U.S. Coast and Geodetic Survey FIELD ENGINEERS BULLETIN no. 10, December 1936
Photos of damage from the 1958 tsunami

 Eyewitness reports of the tsunami
 Video interview with survivors Howard and Sonny Ulrich (boat "Edrie"). "Mega-tsunami: Wave of Destruction". Air Date: BBC2, October 12, 2000.
 Full BBC Program Transcript: "Mega-tsunami: Wave of Destruction". Air Date: BBC2, October 12, 2000. (Video interview with survivors Howard and Sonny Ulrich can be found online.)
History of Lituya Bay, Tsunami and Laperouse (in French)
Giant Waves in Lituya Bay, Alaska; USGS PP 354-C

Bays of Alaska
Bays of Hoonah–Angoon Census Area, Alaska